Adygeysk (Adıgəqalə) is a town in the Republic of Adygea, Russia, located near Krasnodar Reservoir,  northwest of Maykop, the capital of the republic. Population: 12,721 (2020), 

It was previously known as Adygeysk(y) (until July 27, 1976),Teuchezhsk (until 1990).

History
It was founded as the settlement of Adygeysky in 1969 due to the construction of Krasnodar Reservoir. According to some other sources, the original name was "Adygeysk". The name alluded to the Adyghe people indigenous to the region. On July 27, 1976, it was granted town status and renamed Teuchezhsk, for Adyghe poet Tsug Teuchezh. In 1990, the original name was restored.

Administrative and municipal status
Within the framework of administrative divisions, it is, together with two rural localities, incorporated as Adygeysk Republican Urban Okrug—an administrative unit with the status equal to that of the districts. It has the following rural localities under its jurisdiction:
aul of Gatlukay
khutor of Psekups

As a municipal division, Adygeysk Republican Urban Okrug is incorporated as Adygeysk Urban Okrug.

References

Notes

Sources

Е. М. Поспелов (Ye. M. Pospelov). "Имена городов: вчера и сегодня (1917–1992). Топонимический словарь." (City Names: Yesterday and Today (1917–1992). Toponymic Dictionary." Москва, "Русские словари", 1993.

External links
Official website of Adygeysk 
Directory of organizations in Adygeysk 

Cities and towns in Adygea
Populated places established in 1969
Cities and towns built in the Soviet Union
Renamed localities in Russia